Major General Mohamed Zahir (Dhivehi: މުހައްމަދު ޒާހިރު) is a former Chief of Defence Force of the Maldives National Defence Force of the Republic of Maldives. 

After completion of secondary education from Majeediya School in 1972, Zahir joined the civil service and worked in various government departments before enlisting in the Maldives National Defense Force in 1978 to the rank of Sergeant and was commissioned as an officer two years later.

He assumed command as Chief of Staff of MNDF, formerly known as the National Security Service (NSS), on November 11, 1996 as a Brigadier. He was promoted to the rank of Major General on April 21, 2004. He was also the chairman of the MNDF Advisory Council, the highest forum of senior serving officers. Zahir is also known to many Maldivians by the nickname "two two Zahir" (22 Zahir). He held the post of CDF until 18 November 2008.

Zahir is a graduate of Hendon Police College, London, UK and the Naval Postgraduate School, Monterey, United States. He also attended John F. Kennedy School of Government, USA, in a program for Senior Executives in National and International Security.

During his past years of service, he has undertaken various command positions within different units of the MNDF. Before assuming the duties as the Chief of Staff of MNDF, he was also the Deputy Chief of Staff of MNDF. During this tenure, he played an integral role in conceptualizing and doctrinally developing the operational functioning of all the arms and services of the MNDF. He has also commanded the NSS Training Unit, now re-established as Defence Institute for Training and Education, whereby laying the groundwork for restructure and streamlining overall training policies. Zahir's dedicated effort in the development of the military has been highly appreciated by all ranks of Maldives National Defence Force.

For his gallant actions in the incidents of 1988, when a group of PLOTE mercenaries from Sri Lanka attacked the capital Malé, he was awarded the second highest gallantry award, the Medal for Exceptional Bravery. In addition, he is also decorated with the Presidential Medal, Distinguished Service Medal and the Dedicated Service Medal. In 2013 he was awarded the Order of Distinguished Army Service.

On 3 November 2008, Zahir was awarded the nation's highest military decoration, the Medal of Honor by the former President Maumoon Abdul Gayyoom.
Zahir is married to Fathimath Amira. She is the Principal of the Centre for Higher Secondary Education.  The General has four sons and one daughter. His second son, Lieutenant Colonel Hussain Fairoosh is currently serving in Maldives National Defence Force.

References

External links
Maldivian Military Chief visits Army Headquarters 
Maldivian Military Chief Mohamed dahir in Sri Lanka 
MAJOR GENERAL MOHAMED dAHIR CHIEF OF STAFF OF THE NATIONAL SECURITY SERVICE, MALDIVES CALLS ON DGICG - 27 FEB 2006 

|-

Maldivian military personnel
Harvard Kennedy School alumni
1950s births
Living people